Balata (also Romanized as Balatā) is a village in Dasht-e Abbas Rural District, Musian District, Dehloran County, Ilam Province, Iran. At the 2006 census, its population was 108, in 14 families. The village is populated by Arabs.

References 

Populated places in Dehloran County
Arab settlements in llam Province